Sango (also spelled Sangho) is the primary language spoken in the Central African Republic and also the official language of the country. It is used as a lingua franca across the country and had 450,000 native speakers in 1988. It also has 1.6 million second language speakers.

Sango is a creole based on the Northern Ngbandi language. It was used as a trade language along the Ubangi River prior to French colonisation in the 1880s. In colloquial speech 90% of the language's vocabulary is Ngbandi based, whereas in more technical speech French loanwords constitute the majority.

Classification 
Some linguists, following William J. Samarin, classify it as a Ngbandi-based creole; however, others (like Marcel Diki-Kidiri, Charles H. Morrill) reject that classification and say that changes in Sango structures (both internally and externally) can be explained quite well without a creolization process.

According to the creolization hypothesis, Sango is exceptional in that it is an African- rather than European-based creole. Although French has contributed numerous loanwords, Sango's structure is wholly African.

History 

A variety of Sango was used as a lingua franca along the Ubangi River before French colonization, in the late 1800s. The French army recruited Central Africans, causing them to increasingly use Sango as a means of interethnic communication. Throughout the 20th century, missionaries promoted Sango because of its wide usage.

Originally used by river traders, Sango arose as a lingua franca based on the Northern Ngbandi dialect of the Sango tribe, part of the Ngbandi language cluster, with some French influence.

The rapid growth of the city of Bangui since the 1960s has had significant implications for the development of Sango, with the creation, for the first time, of a population of first-language speakers. Whereas rural immigrants to the city spoke many different languages and used Sango only as a lingua franca, their children use Sango as their main (and sometimes only) language. That has led to a rapid expansion of the lexicon, including both formal and slang terms. Also, its new position as the everyday language of the capital city has led to Sango gaining greater status and being used increasingly in fields for which it was previously the norm to use French.

Geographic distribution 
Sango is widespread in the Central African Republic, with 350,000 speakers at the 1970 census. It is also spoken as a lingua franca in southern Chad, where it is probably not spoken natively and its use is decreasing, and in the Democratic Republic of the Congo, where its use is increasing.

Today, Sango is both a national and official language of the Central African Republic, which makes the Central African Republic one of the few African countries to have an indigenous language as an official language.

Registers 
A study by Taber (1964) indicates that some 490 native Sango words account for about 90% of colloquial speech; however, while French loanwords are much more rarely used, they account for the majority of the vocabulary, particularly in the speech of learned people. The situation might be compared to English, in which most of the vocabulary, particularly "learned" words, is derived from Latin, Greek, or French while the basic vocabulary remains strongly Germanic. However, more recent studies suggest that the result is specific to a particular sociolect, the so-called "functionary" variety. Morrill's work, completed in 1997, revealed that there were three sociologically distinct norms emerging in the Sango language: an urban "radio" variety which is ranked by 80% of his interviewees and has very few French loan words; a so-called "pastor" variety, which is scored 60%; and a "functionary" variety, spoken by learned people, who make the highest use of French loanwords while speaking Sango, which scores 40%.

Phonology

Vowels 
Sango has seven oral and five nasal vowels. Vowel quality and number of nasalized vowels may be affected by the mother tongue of non-native speakers of Sango.

Consonants 

Palatal affricates occur in loan words and certain dialects. Some dialects have alternations between [ᶬv] and [m], [ᵐb] and [ᵑ͡ᵐg͡b], [ᵐb] and [b], word-medial [l] and [r], and word-initial [h] and [ʔ]. [ᶬv] is quite rare.

Syllable structure 
Syllable structure is generally CV. Consecutive vowels are rare but do occur. Consonants may be palatalized or labialized, orthographically C and C, respectively.

Words are generally monosyllabic or bisyllabic but less commonly are trisyllabic. Four-syllable words are created via reduplication and compounding, and may also be written as two words (kêtêkêtê or kêtê kêtê 'tiny bit', walikundû or wa likundû 'sorcerer').

Tone 
Sango is a tonal language. The language has three basic tones (high, mid, and low), with contour tones also occurring, generally in French loanwords. Tones have a low functional load, but minimal pairs exist: dü 'give birth' versus dû 'hole'.

Monosyllabic loan words from French usually have the tone pattern high-low falling (bâan 'bench' from French banc). In multisyllabic words all syllables carry low tone except the final syllable, which is lengthened and takes a descending tone. The final tone is generally mid-low falling for nouns (ananäa 'pineapple' from French ananas) and high-low falling for verbs (aretêe 'to stop' from French arrêter).

In isolation, tones have ideolectal variation, and they may also be affected by the mother language of non-native speakers.

Grammar 
Sango is an isolating language with subject–verb–object word order, as in English. Noun phrases are of the form determiner-adjective-noun:

Plurals are marked with the proclitic â-, which precedes noun phrases:

â- may be attached to multiple items in the noun phrase by some speakers, but this is less common:

The derivational suffix -ngö nominalizes verbs. It also changes all tones in the verb to mid:

Genitives are normally formed with the preposition tî 'of':

However, compounding is becoming increasingly common: dûngü 'well' (note the change in tone). Such compounds are sometimes written as two separate words.

The verbal prefix a- is used when the subject is a noun or noun phrase but not when the subject is either a pronoun or implicit (as in imperatives):

The prefix is sometimes written as a separate word.

The pronouns are mbï "I", mo "you (singular)", lo "he, she, it", ë "we", ï "you (plural)", âla "you (plural)", âla "they".  Verbs take a prefix a- if not preceded by a pronoun: mo yeke "you are" but Bêafrîka ayeke "Central Africa is". Particularly useful verbs include yeke "be", bara "greet" (bara o "hi!"), hînga "know". Possessives and appositives are formed with the word tî "of": ködörö tî mbï "my country", yângâ tî sängö "Sango language". Another common preposition is na, covering a variety of locative, dative, and instrumental functions.

Orthography 
Sango began being written by French missionaries, with Catholic and Protestant conventions differing slightly. The 1966 Bible and 1968 hymnal were highly influential and still used today.

In 1984, President André Kolingba signed "Décret No 84.025", establishing an official orthography for Sango. The official Sango alphabet consists of 22 letters:

{|class="wikitable" style="border-collapse:collapse; font-size: 120%;"
|+ Official 1984 orthography
|-
|bgcolor="#EFEFEF" align="center" colspan="33" | 22-Letter Sango Alphabet
|-
|width=3% align="center"|A||width=3% align="center"|B||width=3% align="center"|D||width=3% align="center"|E||width=3% align="center"|F||width=3% align="center"|G||width=3% align="center"|H||width=3% align="center"|I||width=3% align="center"|K||width=3% align="center"|L||width=3% align="center"|M||width=3% align="center"|N||width=3% align="center"|O||width=3% align="center"|P||width=3% align="center"|R||width=3% align="center"|S||width=3% align="center"|T||width=3% align="center"|U||width=3% align="center"|V||width=3% align="center"|W||width=3% align="center"|Y||width=3% align="center"|Z
|}

The official orthography contains the following consonants: : some add  for the implosive . Sango has seven oral vowels, of which five, occur nasalized.

Sango has three tones: low, mid, and high. In standard orthography, low tone is unmarked, mid tone is marked with diaeresis, and high tone with circumflex, : do-re-mi would be written .

Sango has little written material apart from religious literature, but some basic literacy material has been developed.

Learning 

Sango is considered unusually easy to learn; according to Samarin, "with application a student ought to be able to speak the language in about three months." However, reaching true fluency takes much longer, as with any other language.

For English-speakers there are two main difficulties. One must remember not to split double consonants: Bambari, for example, must be pronounced ba-mba-ri, not bam-ba-ri. Also, as with any other tonal language, one must learn not to vary the tone according to the context. For example, if one pronounces a question with a rising tone as in English, one may inadvertently be saying an entirely different and inappropriate Sango word at the end of the sentence.

See also

References

Bibliography 
 Buquiaux, Luc. Jean-Marie Kobozo et Marcel Diki-Kidiri, 1978 Dictionnaire sango-français...
 Diki-Kidiri, Marcel. 1977. Le sango s'écrit aussi...
 Diki-Kidiri, Marcel. 1978. Grammaire sango, phonologie et syntaxe
 Diki-Kidiri, Marcel. 1998. Dictionnaire orthographique du sängö
 Henry, Charles Morrill. 1997. Language, Culture and Sociology in the Central African Republic, The Emergence and Development of Sango
 
 Khabirov, Valeri. 1984. The Main Features of the Grammatical System of Sango (PhD thesis, St. Petersburg University, in Russian)
 Khabirov, Valeri. 2010. Syntagmatic Morphology of Contact Sango. Ural State Pedagogical University. 310 p.
 
 Samarin, William. 1967. Lessons in Sango.
 Saulnier, Pierre. 1994. Lexique orthographique sango
 SIL (Centrafrique), 1995. Kêtê Bakarî tî Sängö: Farânzi, Anglëe na Yângâ tî Zâmani. Petit Dictionnaire Sango, Mini Sango Dictionary, Kleines Sango Wörterbuch
 
 Taber, Charles. 1964. French Loanwords in Sango: A Statistical Analysis. (MA thesis, Hartford Seminary Foundation.)
 Thornell, Christina. 1997. The Sango Language and Its Lexicon (Sêndâ-yângâ tî Sängö)

External links 

 Sangonet.com
 Established French loanwords in Sango
 A site in Sango – Yângâ tî Sangho tî Bêafrîka
 Sango lessons in French
 Sango computer terminology
 PanAfrican L10n page on Sango
 Resources in and about the Sango language

African-based pidgins and creoles
Languages of the Democratic Republic of the Congo
Languages of the Central African Republic
Ubangian languages